East Orange STEM Academy is a specialty magnet public school that serves students in sixth through twelfth grades in East Orange, in Essex County, New Jersey, United States, operating as part of the East Orange School District. The school focuses on the STEM fields, the academic disciplines of science, technology, engineering, and mathematics. It helps to further the education of students in these fields.

As of the 2021–22 school year, the school had an enrollment of 593 students and 44.0 classroom teachers (on an FTE basis), for a student–teacher ratio of 13.5:1. There were 354 students (59.7% of enrollment) eligible for free lunch and 40 (6.7% of students) eligible for reduced-cost lunch.

History
The school was established in September 2011, replacing the East Orange Campus 9 High School with a school that focused on developing student skills in the STEM fields.

Administration
The principal is Dr. Vincent Stallings. His administrative team includes two assistant principals.

References

External links 
East Orange STEM Academy
East Orange School District

School Data for the East Orange School District, National Center for Education Statistics

2011 establishments in New Jersey
Educational institutions established in 2011
East Orange, New Jersey
Magnet schools in New Jersey
Public high schools in Essex County, New Jersey